Marie Charlotte Elisabeth Butts (Thonon, France 1870 – Geneva, Switzerland 1953) was a French educator, translator, and children’s book author. She served as the first General Secretary of the International Bureau of Education (IBE) from 1926-1953, alongside directors Pierre Bovet and Jean Piaget, respectively.

Career 
Butts held several teaching positions from 1895 to 1939, lecturing in subjects such as English language, literature, and industrial psychology. In 1926, she became the first General Secretary of the International Bureau of Education (IBE), a position she retained for 28 years, until the age of 77. In 1947, she was a member of the committee of experts of UNESCO on international understanding. Butts was the author of several children’s books, including Roland le Vaillant Paladin published by Librarie larousse in 1911. She also translated a number of works by English language writers into French, including H.G. Wells, Dhan Gopal Mukerji, and Anatole Le Braz.

References 

French educators
20th-century French women writers
20th-century French writers
20th-century French translators
English–French translators
People from Thonon-les-Bains
19th-century French educators
20th-century French educators
1870 births
1953 deaths
19th-century women educators
20th-century women educators
French Quakers